Ivy Kay Walker, later Thorpe (born 22 September 1911, date of death unknown), was an English athlete who competed in the 1930 Women's World Games and the 1934 British Empire Games.

At the 1930 Women's World Games in Prague she was a member, along with Ethel Scott, Eileen Hiscock and Daisy Ridgley, of the British 4×100 metre relay team which won the silver medal. At the 1934 Empire Games she was a member of the English relay team which won the silver medal in the 220-110-220-110 yards relay competition (with Eileen Hiscock, Nellie Halstead, Ethel Johnson and Walker). In the 220 yards competition she was eliminated in the heats.

External links
Profile at TOPS in athletics
British national athletics records as of 1950

References

1911 births
Year of death missing
English female sprinters
Athletes (track and field) at the 1934 British Empire Games
Commonwealth Games silver medallists for England
Commonwealth Games medallists in athletics
Medallists at the 1934 British Empire Games